"Never in a Million Years" is a song by the American pop singer Laura Branigan, which was released in 1990 by Atlantic Records as the second single from her sixth studio album Laura Branigan. It was written by Van Stephenson, Dave Robbins and Bob Farrell, and produced by Peter Wolf. "Never in a Million Years" was released in the United States as a cassette single and on promotional CD. It reached No. 22 on the US Billboard Adult Contemporary chart. There was no music video made for the song.

In 1991, American singer Vicki Shepard released her own version of the song, which Billboard described as a "bright, disco-fied rendition".

Critical reception
Upon release, Billboard commented: "After a pair of dance-oriented singles, Branigan applies her acrobatic vocal style to a formulaic, but engaging, power ballad." In a review of Laura Branigan, The Clarion-Ledger described the song as a "weepy ballad", adding it was a "probable successor" to Branigan's previous single "Moonlight on Water". The Chicago Tribune described the song as an "understated ballad". People stated: "While Branigan tends toward the histrionic, her slower-tempo tunes - especially "Never in a Million Years" - make for effective pace changers amidst all the belting." Robert M. Natick of Teen Ink said: "The few ballads present are disappointing, though Laura does breath life into "Never in a Million Years".

Track listing
Cassette single
"Never in a Million Years" - 4:10
"Smoke Screen" - 4:08

CD single (US promo)
"Never in a Million Years" - 4:08

Chart performance

Personnel

Never in a Million Years
Laura Branigan - lead vocals
Peter Wolf - instruments, producer, arranger
Peter Maunu - guitar
Alfie Silas, Dorian Holley, Ina Wolf, Joe Pizzulo, Maxi Anderson, Phillip Ingram - backing vocals
Paul Ericksen - engineer, mixing
Stephen Marcussen - mastering
Carlos Golliher - coordinator
Doug Morris - executive producer

Smoke Screen
Laura Branigan - lead vocals
Clif Magness - keyboards, drum programming
Steve Goldstein - keyboards
Steve Lindsey - keyboards, drum programming, co-producer
James Harrah - guitar
Brandon Fields - saxophone
Donna De Lory, Kate Markowitz - backing vocals
Richard Perry - producer
Alan Meyerson - mixing
Eric Anest, Paul Ericksen, Richard Cottrell - engineers
Charlie Pollard, John Karpowich, Richard Engstrom - assistant engineers
Stephen Marcussen - mastering
Julie Larson - coordinator
Doug Morris - executive producer

References

1990s ballads
1990 songs
1990 singles
Laura Branigan songs
Pop ballads
Song recordings produced by Peter Wolf (producer)
Songs written by Van Stephenson
Atlantic Records singles
Songs about heartache